Opera for the Young is a professional, touring opera company based in Madison, Wisconsin.  Founded in 1970, it brings professional opera programs to elementary schools throughout the Midwest during its spring and fall tours.  With nearly 200 performances, reaching approximately 70,000 children annually, Opera for the Young can be counted among the largest opera outreach programs in the nation.

Opera for the Young’s repertoire include age appropriate adaptations of Gretry's Beauty and the Beast, Massenet's Cinderella, Mozart's The Magic Flute, Rossini's The Barber of Seville, Dvořák's Rusalka, Humperdinck's Hansel and Gretel, Donizetti's The Elixir of Love, Sullivan's The Pirates of Penzance, and Orpheus Returns: The Case of the Underworld Zoo with music from Offenbach, Gluck, and Monteverdi.

External links
Opera for the Young website
Opera for the Young Youtube Page

Musical groups established in 1970
Musical groups from Wisconsin
Young
Culture of Madison, Wisconsin
Companies based in Madison, Wisconsin
Performing arts in Wisconsin
1970 establishments in Wisconsin